Mi marido tiene familia, also known as Mi marido tiene más familia for the second season and stylized onscreen as Mi marido tiene + familia, is a Mexican comedy telenovela that premiered on Las Estrellas on June 5, 2017 and ended on February 24, 2019. Produced for Televisa by Juan Osorio and Roy Rojas and created by Héctor Forero López and Pablo Ferrer García-Travesí, based on the South Korean series My Husband Got a Family written by Park Ji-eun and produced by KBS. It stars Zuria Vega, Daniel Arenas, Diana Bracho and Silvia Pinal.

The series revolves around Robert Cooper, a doctor who was adopted by a Colombian American family, but wants to know who his biological parents are. His wife, Julieta Aguilar is in charge of helping him find his family, but she fears that they won't accept her.

On October 18, 2017, Juan Osorio confirmed that the show has been renewed for a second season. The second season premiered on July 9, 2018.

Episodes

Mi marido tiene familia (2017) 
Julieta (Zuria Vega) and Robert (Daniel Arenas) have the perfect relationship: they both have jobs, they share their dreams and have agreed to not get married. For them, the secret lies in two points: communication and the fact that the adoptive family of Robert lives in another country, saving them the problems of dealing with the in-laws. However, fate has prepared a surprise when they must move to an apartment in a modest area of Oaxaca. There they meet the owners of the building, the Córcega family, not knowing that they are the true family of Robert and that his real name is Juan Pablo. From there, Robert / Juan Pablo and Julieta will have to learn to live with their in-laws, Blanca (Diana Bracho) and Eugenio (Rafael Inclán), and the sisters-in-law, with all the demands that this entails: a battle between tradition and modernity (including to have the couple get married), a whirlwind of emotions and adventures. If they want to achieve the happiness they are looking for, Julieta and Juan Pablo must learn to live with their new family, even if this is more complicated than they thought.

Mi marido tiene más familia (2018–19) 

Finally, Julieta has managed to maintain a personal and professional life with balance, next to Robert and their children: the adopted 4-year-old David, and biological daughter Blanquita who is just months old. Again, the Córcega family will face a series of problems, unleashed when Robert finds his grandfather, Canuto "Tito" Córcega (Carlos Bracho), the "deceased" father of Eugenio, Tulio and Audifaz, something Doña Imelda made them believe when he unexpectedly left.

hunexpectedlyaleft due s unfaithful to Crisanta decades ago. On the other hand, Julieta goes through hot flashes with the arrival of Susana Córcega (Susana González), as her new boss, but Susana is nothing more and nothing less than the daughter that Canuto and Crisanta procreated in Baja California, and together they get to know the rest Córcega to Oaxaca. Susana will test Julieta's ability to excel; she can not believe that her new boss is Robert's blood-related aunt and, therefore, her political aunt. Believing that fate is determined to put more obstacles than he has already had to cross, definitely so it is, because now Julieta has more political family, something that she always wanted to flee. Daniela and Gabriel The bears, have built a stable marriage before the conflicts of their families: the Córcega and the Musi. Daniela will take on a greater challenge when Gabriel asks her to have a son, in itself it was to marry him and his family to accept it. This will trigger even more problems between families.

For Robert, it is a real miracle to have found all of the Córcegas, who also include Susana, half-sister of Eugenio, Tulio and Audifaz, and Sebastián and Axel, sons of Susana and cousins of Robert. Susana also happens to be the new head director of Klass, the company Julieta works at and temporarily led, pushing her to "second-in-command". New tenants, Francisco "Pancho" López and his children, move into the building as a way of escaping from their hurtful past in Mexico City. The remaining members of the Córcega family will detonate a new thread: the fights. This implies new challenges in the lives of Julieta and Robert, including uniting the entire Córcega clan and standing up for yourself at work, and together they will demonstrate that, in spite of the problems of the families they will be able to follow ahead, seeing by their well-being.

Cast

Main 
 Zuria Vega as Julieta Aguilar Rivera
 Daniel Arenas as Robert Cooper / Juan Pablo Córcega
 Diana Bracho as Blanca Gómez de Córcega
 Silvia Pinal as Imelda Sierra de Córcega
 Arath de la Torre as Francisco "Pancho" López (season 2)
 Susana González as Susana Córcega (season 2)
 Carmen Salinas as Crisanta Díaz de Córcega (season 2)
 Gabriel Soto as Ernesto "Neto" Rey (season 2)

Recurring and guest 

 Rafael Inclán as Eugenio Córcega
 Luz María Jerez as Belén Gómez (season 1)
 René Casados as Audifaz Córcega
 Olivia Bucio as Catalina Rivera
 Lola Merino as Ana Romano (season 1)
 Regina Orozco as Amalia Gómez
 Gaby Platas as Amapola "Polita" Casteñeda
 Laura Vignati as Daniela Córcega
 Jessica Coch as Marisol Córcega (season 1)
 Ignacio Casano as Hugo Aguilar 
 José Pablo Minor as Gabriel Musi
 Federico Ayos as Bruno Aguilar (season 1)
 Jade Fraser as Linda Córcega
 Emilio Osorio as Aristóteles Córcega
 Marco Muñoz as Tulio Córcega
 Juan Vidal as Julián Guerra (season 1)
 Isabella Tena as Frida Meneses
 Paola Toyos as Begoña Bustamante (season 1)
 Marcos Montero as Ignacio Meneses
 Bárbara Islas as Diana Mejía
 Luis Gerardo Cuburu as Octavio
 Latin Lover as Enzo
 Yahir as Xavi Galán (season 1)
 Eric Del Castillo as Hugo Aguilar (season 1)
 Mauricio Abularach as Benjamín (season 1)
 Violeta Isfel as Clarissa Musi 
 Manuel Landeta as Augusto Musi (season 1)
 María Nela Sinisterra as Luz (season 1)
 Ligia Uriarte as Daphne (season 1)
 Carlos Bracho as Canuto "Tito" Córcega (season 2)
 Ana Jimena Villanueva as Cassandra Musi 
 Gonzalo Vega Sisto como Axel Legorreta Córcega (season 2)
 Carlos Madrigal as Vicente Legorreta (season 2)
 Paola Acher as Eréndira
 Rodrigo Pérez "El Canelito" as Sebastián Legorreta Córcega (season 2)
 Ruy Rodrigo as David Cooper Aguilar 
 Márama as themselves (guest; season 1)
 Pau y Davo as themselves (guest; season 1)
 Flor Rubio as Herself (guest; season 1)
 Marjorie de Sousa as Herself (guest; season 1)
 Patricio Castillo as Massimo Musi (season 2)
 Joaquín Bondoni as Cuauhtémoc "Temo" López (season 2)
 Mayrín Villanueva as Rebeca Treviño Garza (guest; season 2)

Production 
Filming for the telenovela began on April 11, 2017 in Oaxaca. Locations in Mexico included Oaxaca and Televisa San Ángel. The trailer for the telenovela was unveiled on the upfront of Univision for the 2017-2018 television season. The telenovela was renewed for a second season on 18 October 2017, days before the end of the first season. The season started filming on 9 May 2018 and ended in February 2019. On 28 May 2018, People en Español confirmed that the telenovela would change its title to Mi marido tiene más familia. According to Juan Osorio, the change of the title was agreed to give more meaning to the story.

Casting 

Like the previous season several actors will resume their characters such as Zuria Vega, Daniel Arenas, Laura Vignatti, José Pablo Minor, Diana Bracho, Rafael Inclán, and Silvia Pinal. On December 22, 2017, it was confirmed that Arath de la Torre would play Pancho López, a character that he played in 2011 in the telenovela Una familia con suerte. On 1 May 2018 it was confirmed that Vega's brother, Gonzalo Vega would be in the second season, as well as Susana González, Carlos Bracho and the return to television of Carmen Salinas.

On August 31, 2018, it was confirmed that the actress Zuria Vega would leave the production.  On September 12, 2018, it was confirmed that the second season would lengthen to more chapters due to the audience obtained throughout 2018. After the extension of the production and the exit of Vega, it was confirmed on September 28, 2018, that the actor Daniel Arenas would leave the telenovela due to family commitments. Due to the lengthening of the second season and the departure of the protagonists, on October 26, 2018 People en Español magazine confirmed that Gabriel Soto would enter the production as protagonist with Susana González, and Arath de la Torre. It also confirmed the inclusion of new actors such as the twins José Manuel and José Pablo, and Azul Guaita.

Music 
The main theme of the telenovela "Tú eres la razón" was composed by Eduardo Murguía and Mauricio Arriaga and performed by Angelina & Los Fontana. The second song titled "Llegaste a mi vida" was composed by José Luis Roma and performed by Yahir.

Spin-off 
Juan Osorio confirmed in February 2019 that the series would have a spin-off based upon "Aristemo", the gay couple formed by the characters of the series Aristóteles Córcega and Temo López portrayed by Emilio Osorio and Joaquín Bondoni respectively. Filming of the spin-off began in April 2019. El corazón nunca se equivoca premiered on June 24, 2019.

Rating

Mexico rating

U.S. rating

Awards and nominations

Notes

References

External links 
 

Mexican telenovelas
Televisa telenovelas
2010s Mexican television series
Las Estrellas original programming
2017 telenovelas
2017 Mexican television series debuts
2019 Mexican television series endings
Mexican LGBT-related television shows
2018 telenovelas
Mexican television series based on South Korean television series
Spanish-language telenovelas